The Path of Saint-Charles (Cammino di San Carlo) is an historical, artistic and devotional route which follows the travels of saint Charles Borromeo from Arona, his native town, and Viverone, where the path joins the Via Francigena.

The 200 km may be divided in twelve stages for walkers and in four stages for bikers.

This path is one of the most important ways of CoEur - In the heart of European paths.

Origin of the path 
The birth of the path is due to a research made about saint Charles and his passages in northern Piedmont and of the Biellese territory in particular. This research allowed to trace the numerous transits of Borromeo through the valleys of Biella. We also have proofs of his presence in this area thanks to the many consecration of altars and churches between 1610 and 1640, year of his canonization.

Saint Charles in northern Piedmont 
Saint Charles passed through the northern Piedmont many times throughout his pilgrimages and his travels. Many places have trace of his transit and we also have information thanks to his letters.

In 1571, 1578 and 1584, he visited the Sacro Monte di Varallo in order to check its construction. He also stopped there during his many travels between Milan and Turin in order to visit the Shroud of Turin.

In September 1584, Saint Charles was in the Biellese territory in order to visit a relative of his, the marquis Besso Ferrero Fieschi of Masserano, who was sick. After leaving Masserano, Charles went to Vercelli and afterwards to Turin, to visit the Shroud. He went back to Biella on 10 October, when the marquis Besso died. The next day, the saint went to Masserano to minister the burial.

The day after he left for Varallo, where he arrived on 12 October. He stayed there until 29 October and, despite his malaria, he left for Switzerland to sign a document, and afterwards he went back to Milan, where he died on 3 November.

The stages 
 Arona (colossus of Saint Charles) - Orta. It connects the Lake Maggiore with the Lake Orta.
 Orta - Varallo. The stage walk through the Peregrinatio, the historica path between the two Sacri Monti.
 Varallo - Guardabosone. The route passes through the Val Sesia, where you can see two beautiful churches: Madonna di Loreto in Varallo and S. Giovanni al Monte in Quarona.
 Guardabosone - Coggiola. Stage entirely in Valsessera.
 Coggiola - Brughiera di Trivero. This stage connects three sanctuaries: Cavallero, Novareia and Brughiera. 
 Brughiera di Trivero - Pettinengo. Walk in the Strona valley.
 Pettinengo - S. Giovanni d'Andorno. The stage enters the Cervo Valley and ends at the Sanctuary of San Giovanni d'Andorno.
 S. Giovanni d'Andorno - Santuario di Oropa. The way walks on a segment of the tracciolino, the road imagined by Ermenegildo Zegna but never realized, which connects the Sanctuary of S. Giovanni with the Sanctuary of Oropa, the most important sanctuary devoted to the black Madonna in the Alps.
 Santuario d'Oropa - Sordevolo. We pass through the Elvo valley, cross the Burcina park, and arrive in Sordevolo, where, every five years, a popular Passion play is staged.
 Sordevolo - Santuario di Graglia. We encounter two sites of the Ecomuseum of the Biellese (Trappa of Sordevolo and Bagneri village) and arrive at the Sanctuary of Graglia.
 Graglia - Chiaverano. The itinerary goes in Canavese, passing the Serra d'Ivrea.
 Chiaverano - Viverone. Stage, along which we encounter the Bose Monastic Community, that connects the Path of Saint Charles with the Via Francigena.

By bike 
 1st stage: Arona (colossum of Saint Charles) - Sacro Monte di Varallo (66 km)
 2nd stage: Sacro Monte di Varallo - Sanctuario della Brughiera (52 km)
 3rd stage: Santuario della Brughiera - Santuario di Oropa (45 km)
 4th stage: Santuario di Oropa - Via Francigena (54 km)

The UNESCO sites 
The path connects five world heritage UNESCO sites.
 Three Sacri Monti of Piedmont and Lombardy :
 Sacro Monte di Oropa
 Sacro Monte di Varallo
 Sacro Monte di Orta
 Two Prehistoric pile dwellings around the Alps :
 VI.1-Emissario in Viverone 
 Site near the Lagoni di Mercurago (Arona)

Natural reserves 
Along the way there are many nature parks and natural reserves.
 Nature park of the Lagoni of Mercurago
 Nature park of Monte Fenera
 Natural reserve of the Parco Burcina - Felice Piacenza
 Natural reserve of the Bessa
 Natural reserve of the Sacro Monte di Varallo
 Natural reserve of the Sacro Monte di Orta
 Natural reserve of the Sacro Monte di Oropa
 Protected area of the Oasi Zegna
 SCI of the Valsessera

See also 
 CoEur - In the heart of European paths
 Via Francigena
 Camino de Santiago
 UNESCO

External links 
 official site

References 

Hiking trails in Italy
Charles Borromeo